Raoul Perre (also known as HOW) and Davide Perre (also known as NOSM) are twin graffiti artists from New York City. They are both members of the Bronx-based graffiti crew, TATS CRU "The Mural Kings."

Born in the Basque Country of San Sebastián, Spain, both grew up in Düsseldorf, Germany and began doing graffiti in 1988. They spent their late teenage years traveling the world painting walls and trains with each other. While visiting New York City in 1997, both were asked to become members of TATS CRU, and permanently relocated to New York City shortly thereafter in 1999.

Careers

As a member of TATS CRU, both create elaborate murals for well known commercial clients like Sony. Both have also lectured at universities including MIT and their work have appeared in numerous films, music videos, documentaries, and most recently, the windows of the historic department store, Lord and Taylor.

Both have been featured within the pages of numerous publications, including The New York Times and New York Magazine, and even stirred the likes of the Rev. Al Sharpton with the controversial undertones of subjects manifested within their art.

Additionally, Davide Perre is featured in a new interview in Amateur Magazine issue 012.


See also 
 Graffiti in the United States

References

External links 
 Tats Cru, Inc. website
 Interview with Nosm about TATS Cru

American graffiti artists
Spanish artists
Living people
American twins
Year of birth missing (living people)
Artists from the Bronx